The Free Music School (abbreviated as BMS or БМШ) is a private music and educational organization in St. Petersburg, Russia.

Founding and purpose
The Free Music School was conceived by its founders not only as an educational organization, but also as a concert organization (concert fees were an important source of the school's income). Concerts of the BMSh (choral conducted by Lomakin and orchestral by Balakirev) in the 1860s and 1870s became a platform for promoting new Russian music. The quality of the pupils upon their entry is noted to have been relatively low, Cesar Cui noting that most students at the beginning of their studies could not read any music.

Dissolution and successor
The school's student body began to drastically reduce by the late 1860s after Gavriil lomakin stepped away from leadership in 1868, and soon dissolved in 1917 due to the beginning of the revolution. The successor of the BMS in St. Petersburg (since 1918) was the Musical School named after N. A. Rimsky-Korsakov[rus].

Literature 

 Stasov V. V. Twenty-fifth anniversary of the Free Music School // IV 1887, No. 3, pp. 599-642; reprint on Sat. articles by Stasov (M., 1953).
 Korabelnikova L.Z. Free music school // Musical Encyclopedia. T.1. M., 1973, column 443.
 Free music school // Petrovskaya I.F. Musical education and musical public organizations in St. Petersburg 1801-1917. Encyclopedia. SPb., 1999, pp. 39-44.

References 
Music schools